Charles Léon Bonvin (February 28, 1834 – January 30, 1866) was a French  watercolor artist known for  genre painting, realist still life and  delicate and melancholic landscapes.

Biography 
Bonvin was born in Vaugirard (at the time a municipality on the outskirts of Paris, today part of the city) in humble circumstances. He was the son of a constable and a seamstress who owned a poor guinguette. He had numerous siblings and lived in a barren plain; the household money was scarce.

As a young boy he began making small charcoal sketches, and gradually ink drawings. His older step brother François Bonvin encouraged him to continue and provided him with paints and the advice to carefully study the old masters of the Dutch Golden Age.

He probably attended some of the free classes offered by l'École royale gratuite de dessin created by Bachelier but was mostly self-taught.
He also learned to play music on a harmonium.

In 1861 Bonvin married, soon had children, and worked as an innkeeper. The young couple struggled; the inn lost money; anguish set in. Yet painting in the stillness of early morning, at dusk or at night, Bonvin was able to create numerous genre paintings echoing the manner of Jean Siméon Chardin, meticulous still life studied with the precision of a botanist and subtle landscapes capturing fleeting atmospheric effects and solitude. These were mostly fragile watercolors for affordability reasons, oil paints being more expensive.

He approached gallerists on rue Laffitte and rue du Bac, but he made few sales of his watercolors. In January 1866, Bonvin traveled to Paris again to offer his watercolors to a dealer, who rejected them as too dark. Desperate, he hung himself the next day in the forest, on January 30, 1866, and was discovered a few days later; he was 31 years of age.

Posterity 
At the initiative of his step brother François, because of the dire circumstances in which his family was left, a special art sale of his works was organized to raise money, with artists donating their own works as well; these included Claude Monet, Henri Fantin-Latour, and Johan Barthold Jongkind, among many others "who must have been aware of the quality of Léon's art or knew his brother François Bonvin".

The special sale took place at the Hôtel Drouot in Paris on May 24, 1866.

Art historian Gabriel P. Weisberg, in Léon Bonvin's Realism revisited, wrote:
<blockquote>"What has been advanced here is that others recognized the significance of both artists at the time, although it was François who generated more discussion since he lived longer, completed oil paintings, and was a regular exhibitor at the Paris Salon.Léon Bonvin's watercolors capture a sense of the ineffable with a delicacy that belies the destitute circumstances of his daily life. Seeing just a few of his watercolors is spellbinding and haunting."</blockquote>
Among the collectors interested in Bonvin’s work, William T. Walters, father of Henry Walters, founder of the Walters Art Museum, who acquired some of Bonvin’s  fragile works. His collection eventually comprised 56 watercolors and one, rare oil. Today, it is the largest collection of Bonvin's work in existence.

 Collections 
 Walters Art Museum
 Metropolitan Museum of Art
 J. Paul Getty Museum
 Morgan Library & Museum
 Museum of Fine Arts, Houston
 Louvre
 Musée du Luxembourg
British Museum

 Bibliography 
 Gabriel P. Weisberg, William R. Johnston : The Drawings and Water Colors of Leon Bonvin'', Cleveland Museum of Art, 02/01/1981,

References

External links 
 Leon Bonvin on Artnet
 Press release, The Cleveland Museum of Art, November 12, 1980, on Archive.org
 Resources from the Frick Art Reference Library

1834 births
1866 deaths
Suicides by hanging in France
19th-century French painters
French still life painters
French landscape painters
French genre painters
French watercolourists
Sibling artists